The Société québécoise du cannabis (SQDC), a subsidiary of the government-owned SAQ, has a legislated monopoly on the sale of recreational cannabis within the province of Québec. The act establishing the Crown corporation, Bill 157, was tabled in the National Assembly of Quebec on November 16, 2017, and was officially adopted on June 12, 2018.

To manage a contract valued at approximately CAD$500million
(million), the Government of Quebec opened 12 SQDC branches in 2018; by March 2022, this had increased to 87 SQDC retail locations throughout the province.

Financing
Under the Act respecting the Société des alcools du Québec, the SQDC's revenues from the sale of cannabis must be used for the following purposes:
 The elimination of any deficit that the SQDC may incur;
 The transfer to be made by the Minister of Finance each year to the Cannabis Prevention and Research Fund, and also the prevention of the use of psychoactive substances, as well as the fight against related harms.

See also
 Cannabis in Quebec

References

External links
 Société québécoise du cannabis

Crown corporations of Quebec
Cannabis in Quebec
2017 in cannabis
Canadian provincial cannabis departments and agencies
2017 establishments in Quebec
Cannabis shops in Canada